The Australian Chamber of Commerce and Industry (ACCI) is Australia's largest and most representative business association, comprising state and territory chambers of commerce and national industry associations. ACCI represents Australian businesses of all shapes and sizes, across all sectors of the economy, and from every corner of the country.

ACCI contributes to public discussion and government decision-making on issues that impact on business, including economics, trade, workplace relations, work health and safety and employment, education and training. The Chamber also speaks on behalf of Australian business in international forums.

The current chief executive of ACCI is Andrew McKellar and the president is Nola Watson. The organization is headquartered in Canberra, with offices in Sydney, Melbourne and Perth.

Leadership

Chief Executive Officers 
 Ian Spicer AM, 1992-1996
 Mark Paterson AO, 1996-2001
 Lyndon Rowe, (acting) 2001-2002
 Dr Peter Hendy, 2002-2008
 Peter Anderson, 2008-2014
 Kate Carnell AO, 2014-2016
 James Pearson, 2016–2021
 Andrew McKellar, 2021–present

Presidents 
 John Clark AM, 1992-1993
 Harold Clough AO, OBE, 1993-1995
 Graeme Samuel AO, 1995-1997
 Robert Gerard AO, 1997-1999
 Dr John Keniry AM, 1999-2001
 David Gray AM, 2001-2003
 Neville Sawyer AM, 2003-2005
 Peter O’Brien, 2005-2007
 Tony Howarth AO, 2007-2009
 David Michaelis, 2009-2011
 Richard Holyman, 2011-2013
 Peter Hood, 2013-2015
 Terry Wetherall AM, 2015–2017
 Jeremy Johnson AM, 2017–2019
 Ray Sputore, 2019–2021
 Nola Watson, 2021–present

History 
The Australian Chamber of Commerce and Industry has a history that dates back more than 190 years.

The Chamber Movement commenced in Australia when the Sydney Chamber of Commerce was established in 1826. Across the 19th century, Chambers of Commerce were formed in Adelaide (1839), Melbourne, Hobart and Launceston (each in the 1850s), Brisbane (1868), Fremantle (1873) and Perth (1890).

Chambers of Manufacturers were also formed in this era, including in Victoria (1865), South Australia (1869), NSW (1885), Western Australia (1890) and Queensland (1911). Australia's first industry association was Master Builders Australia (1870).

Employer unions and federations also emerged, including the Victorian Employers Union (1865), the NSW Employers Union (1888), South Australian Employers Federation (1889) and the Queensland Employers Federation (1886). Business actors were important for Australia's development from the beginning, with a growing population driving the establishment of enterprises.

In the decade before Federation in 1901, several Australia-wide bodies were formed to advocate national policies: the Australian Chamber of Commerce (ACC), the Associated Chambers of Manufacturers of Australia (ACMA) and the Australian Council of Employers Federations (ACEF).

Through the Great War, the Great Depression, World War II and the post-war boom, business organizations continued advocacy on behalf of private enterprise and the community in pursuit of a prosperous Australia.

In 1977 the ACMA and the ACEF merged to form the Confederation of Australian Industry (CAI). In 1992 the CAI merged with the ACC to form the Australian Chamber of Commerce and Industry (ACCI).

Structure 
The Australian Chamber is a non-profit organization whose members are chambers of commerce of Australia's states and territories and national industry associations.

The Australian Chamber is governed by a constitution and is led by a Board. Board members are elected from the membership at the Annual General Meeting held each November.

The General Council, comprising the Board and other member representatives, oversees the Australian Chamber's policy development. The General Council meets three times a year and is advised by policy committees and working parties that meet between General Council meetings.

Policy

The Australian Chamber has formal policies on a range of matters:

Economics and Industry: The Australian Chamber supports a strong, dynamic and globally competitive Australian economy can only be achieved by advancing economic reform. It argues to lower and simplify taxes, streamline the federation, reduce the size of government, cut excessive red tape, improve efficiency and enhance national productivity.

Employment, Education and Training: The Australian Chamber supports developing innovative and proactive programs that improve workforce participation, encourage apprenticeships and provide for better transitions from learning to work. It argues for a focus on greater employment of young or disadvantaged job seekers, including mature-age workers, people with a disability and indigenous Australians.

Small Business: The Australian Chamber says Australia's two million small businesses that employ seven million people are the backbone of the economy. It argues for a focus on cutting red tape, simplifying the tax system, improving access to finance, making it easier to employ people and building better infrastructure.

Sustainability: The Australian Chamber supports sustainable development that maintains the capacity of society, the economy and the environment to satisfy the needs of current and future generations. It argues for a focus on improving transport infrastructure and services to ensure Australia's growing cities are efficient, productive and livable.

Trade and International Affairs: The Australian Chamber supports global free trade as a principal driver of economic prosperity and peace, with greater cooperation facilitated through multilateral, plurilateral and bilateral trade liberalization. It argues for a focus on ensuring better, easier and more seamless access to new markets, investment opportunities and innovations for Australian businesses.

Workplace Relations: The Australian Chambers supports a world-class workplace relations system that promotes individual flexibility, greater job opportunities and more productive and effective workplaces. It argues for a focus on ensuring modern workplace laws reflect and address 21st century business and community needs without undue third-party interference or lost competitiveness.

Work Health and Safety: The Australian Chamber says its member network is committed to ensuring that every person, every day, returns home safely from work; work where everyone is continually looking for better ways of doing things and improving work health and safety culture, and performance, including in psychological health. It says business supports nationally consistent WHS legislation and supports non-regulatory approaches where all parties, employers, employees and others have mutual and collective responsibilities for health and safety.

Advocacy 
In 2016 the Australian Chamber released its “Top 10 in 10: Ten steps towards a more competitive Australia” policy manifesto. The 10 steps are: 
 Give young people a chance to succeed by making it easier for employers to take on apprentices and trainees
 Ensure government spending is sustainable by reducing it to less than 25% of GDP
 Help industries grow through workplace regulation that better responds to their needs
 Let entrepreneurs get on with growing their businesses by reducing government red tape each year
 Create jobs by allowing employers and employees to negotiate workplace arrangements that best meet their needs
 Boost incomes by cutting the company tax rate to 25% within ten years through annual reductions
 Build the transport, communications and energy facilities we need by backing the independent plan of Infrastructure Australia
 Lower building costs by bringing back the Australian Building and Construction Commission
 Encourage innovation and value for money by facilitating greater competition in government-funded education, health and aged care services
 Welcome more international visitors by making visas cheaper and easier to obtain
The Australian Chamber advocates on behalf of employers at the Fair Work Commission and other industrial bodies in matters including the Annual Wage Review.

Members 
Members of the Australian Chamber are state and territory chambers of business, and national industry associations. They include:

Chamber Members 
 Business SA
 Canberra Business Chamber
 Chamber of Commerce and Industry Queensland
 Chamber of Commerce and Industry of Western Australia
 Chamber of Commerce Northern Territory
 New South Wales Business Chamber
 Tasmanian Chamber of Commerce and Industry
 Victorian Chamber of Commerce and Industry

Industry Association Members 

 
 Accord Australasia
 Air Conditioning and Mechanical Contractors' Association
 Aged and Community Services Australia 
 Association of Independent Schools of NSW
 Association of Financial Advisers
 Australian Subscription Television and Radio Association 
 Australian Automotive Dealer Association 
 Australian Beverages Council Limited
 Australian Dental Association 
 Australian Dental Industry Association
 Australian Federation of Employers and Industries
 Australian Federation of Travel Agents 
 Australian Gift and Homewares Association
 Australian Hotels Association
 Australian International Airlines Operations Group
 Australian Made Campaign Limited
 Australian Mines and Metals Association
 Australian Paint Manufacturers' Federation Inc
 Australasian Pizza Association
 Australian Recording Industry Association Ltd
 Australian Retailers' Association
 Australian Self Medication Industry Inc
 Australian Steel Institute 
 Australian Tourism Awards Inc
 The Australian Veterinary Association 
 Boating Industry Association
 Business Council of Co-operatives and Mutuals
 Bus Industry Confederation 
 Caravan Industry Association
 Cement Concrete Aggregates Australia
 Chiropractors' Association of Australia 
 Cruise Lines International Association
 Consult Australia
 Customer Owned Banking Association
 Council of Private Higher Education Inc
 Direct Selling Association of Australia Inc
 Exhibition and Event Association of Australasia
 Fitness Australia 
 Hire & Rental Industry Assoc Ltd
 Housing Industry Association
 Large Format Retail Association 
 Live Performance Australia
 Master Builders Australia Limited
 Master Plumbers & Mechanical Services Association of Australia
 Medicines Australia
 Medical Technology Association of Australia
 National Disability Services
 National Electrical and Communications Association
 National Employment Service Association 
 National Fire Industry Association
 National Online Retail Association 
 National Retail Association Limited
 The National Roads and Motorists Association 
 Think Brick Australia 
 NSW Taxi Council 
 Outdoor Media Association
 Oil Industry Industrial Association
 Pharmacy Guild of Australia
 Phonographic Performance Company of Australia 
 Plastics and Chemicals Industries Association
 Printing Industries Association of Australia
 Recruitment and Consulting Services Association of Australia and New Zealand
 Restaurant and Catering Australia
 Screen Producers Australia
 The Tax Institute
 Victorian Automobile Chamber of Commerce

International Network 
The Australian Chamber speaks on behalf of Australian business in international forums, including: 
 International Chamber of Commerce
 Business and Industry Advisory Committee to the Organisation for Economic Co-operation and Development
 International Organisation of Employers
 Confederation of Asia-Pacific Chambers of Commerce and Industry
 Confederation of Asia-Pacific Employers
 International Labour Organization

Notable former staff 
Former staff at the Australian Chamber include:
 Dan Tehan, a government minister who was the Australian Chamber's Director of Trade Policy and International Affairs in 2007–08.
 Nicolle Flint, a member of Parliament who was the Australian Chamber's Director of Corporate Relations in 2004–07.

See also
 Economy of Australia

References

External links
Australian Chamber of Commerce and Industry

Chambers of commerce in Australia